The Saurkundi Pass Trek is a hiking trail in the Kullu district of Himachal Pradesh, a state of northern India.  The trek is an 11-day program and participants hike every day during the period. The groups range from 40 to 50 persons (children below the age of 15 years are not allowed). The trail starts at Babeli, the base camp, and passes through scenic spots in the Kullu valley.

Base Camp

Babeli (4000 feet) along Kullu- Manali highway, about 7 kilometres from Kullu, is the Base Camp.  It is connected by road from Kullu, which in turn is connected with Delhi, Chandigarh and other cities of Punjab.  Base camp is situated along the Beas river, with tall and old pine trees alongside the road.

Two days are kept for orientation and acclimatization at base camp, which includes rappelling and rock climbing on one day and trekking in the forests for a few kilometers with weight in the rucksack.

Trek

Segli

Segli is the next camp at 7,100 feet after trekking up for about 8 kilometres from a point a few kilometers from Manali on Kullu- Manali Highway by Bus). The camp is in an apple orchard and is surrounded by forests.

Haura Thatch

The trekkers reach the next camp Haura Thatch (9,000 feet) after trekking for about 10 kilometres. The camp is in a dense forest where little light penetrates.

Maylee Thatch
After 6 km of a difficult and tiring trek, the camp at Maylee Thatch (10,500 feet) is reached. Morning has magnificent views.

Doura Thatch
After trekking for about 10 kilometres through the clouds and trekking on snow for the first time, trekkers reach the next camp at Doura Thatch (11,300 feet). The day’s trek is a journey through the clouds.

Saurkundi Pass

The next day’s trek is through the snow or alongside snow. Trekkers next reach Saurkundi Pass (12,900 feet).

Longa Thatch

Longa Thatch (10,800 feet) is reached after a  trek of 12 kilometres via Saurkundi Pass.

Lekhni
After trekking another 10 kilometres mainly down-hill, the last camp site is at Lekhni (8,100 feet). It is situated alongside an apple orchard.

The final trek is downhill from Lekhni to Aalloo ground along the Manali-Kullu highway and from there by bus back to Babeli. Here, the group breaks up after morning breakfast.

External links

   on Saurkundi Pass Trek of Youth Hostels Association of India.
   on National Himalayan Trekking Expedition of Youth Hostels Association of India.
   on Youth Hostels Association of India.
 Birds of Sar Pass Trek & Saurkundi Pass Trek
 Butterflies of Sar Pass Trek & Saurkundi Pass Trek
 Landscapes of Saurkundi Pass Trek

References 

Hiking trails in Himachal Pradesh